Wildcat Creek is a stream in Houston County, in the U.S. state of Minnesota.

Wildcat Creek was named for the cougars once frequent in the area.

See also
List of rivers of Minnesota

References

Rivers of Houston County, Minnesota
Rivers of Minnesota
Southern Minnesota trout streams
Driftless Area